The Troy Trojans men's golf teams represent Troy University located in Troy, Alabama, and compete in National Collegiate Athletic Association (NCAA) Division I and the Sun Belt Conference.  The Trojans play their home matches at the Troy Country Club, and use the newly built/renovated Trojan Oaks Golf Practice Facility for practicing.

History

The Troy men's golf team began playing golf 1951, competing primarily in the Alabama Collegiate Conference.  In 1968 and 1969, then player and future head coach Mike Griffin who was the #1 seed player for Troy State, won the Alabama Collegiate Conference individual championship two years in a row.

Under head coach Mike Griffin, the Trojan men were one of the most dominant golf teams in the NCAA, winning two Division II national championships and also finishing as a runner-up.  In total, the Trojan men have won three NCAA Division II Men's Golf Championships in 1976, 1977, and 1984. They also finished as national runner-up in 1978, 1983, and 1992. From 1975 to 1993, the Trojan men's golf team made an unprecedented 19-straight appearances in the NCAA Division II Golf Championships.  During Griffin's coaching tenure, player Paul Perini went on to win the NCAA Division II Individual Championship in 1980.

Griffin was inducted into the Golf Coaches Association of America Hall of Fame in 2000 for his accomplishments.

In 2002, Matt Terry took over the head coaching position at Troy.  He has helped lead Troy from their transition from Division II to Division I, and has had remarkable success doing so, winning eight conference championships since the team joined Division I.  Terry has also led Troy to multiple national rankings, and five NCAA Regional appearances.

In 2017, player Cam Norman qualified to receive an individual at-large bid to the NCAA Golf Championship held at Rich Harvest Farms. He finished tied for 23rd place, which is the highest a Trojan player has ever finished in individual competition at the NCAA Golf Championship since Troy joined Division I in 1994.

National Championships
NCAA Division II – national champions: 1976, 1977, 1984
NCAA Division II – national runner-up: 1978, 1983, 1992
NCAA Division II – individual national champions: 1980: Paul Perini

Conference championships

Division II
1975 Gulf South Conference
1976 Gulf South Conference
1980 Gulf South Conference
1981 Gulf South Conference
1982 Gulf South Conference
1983 Gulf South Conference
1984 Gulf South Conference
1986 Gulf South Conference
1987 Gulf South Conference
1988 Gulf South Conference
1990 Gulf South Conference

Division I
1994 East Coast Conference
1995 Mid-Continent Conference
1996 Mid-Continent Conference
1997 Mid-Continent Conference
2016 Sun Belt Conference

NCAA appearances

Team results

Individual results

Award winners
Elite 89 Award
Tolver Dozier – 2015

All-Americans
The Troy men's golf team has had 38 players named All-Americans, with 10 of them being named 1st Team All-American.

Trojans on professional tours

 Ben Bates
 Josh Broadaway
 Ricky Beck
 Tolver Dozier
 Zach Portemont
 Jake Tucker

Trojan Oaks Golf Complex 
The Trojans golf team's home practice course is the Trojan Oaks Practice Course, located in Troy, Alabama.  The facility, which underwent a $1.5 million renovation in 2013, used 40 acres of the original Trojan Oaks Golf Course and created a 9-hole, par-34 practice course plus state-of-the-art putting and chipping greens, a wedge practice area, a full driving range, and a new golf clubhouse.  The courses hitting bays feature FlightScope Technology for swing analysis, Sam PuttLab for putting analysis, and BodiTrak monitors to measure the body weight shifting when players swing.  It is the only course of its kind on the Sun Belt Conference.

References